The Story of a Poor Young Man is a 1995 Italian drama film directed by Ettore Scola.

The film entered the 52nd Venice International Film Festival, where Isabella Ferrari was awarded with the Volpi Cup for best supporting actress.

Alberto Sordi's performance was awarded with the Grolla d'oro for best leading actor in 1995.

Cast 
 Alberto Sordi: Bartoloni
 Rolando Ravello: Vincenzo Persico
 Isabella Ferrari: Andreina
 André Dussollier: Deputy Prosecutor Moscati 
 Sara Franchetti: Mother of Vincenzo
 Mario Carotenuto: Pieralisi
 Renato De Carmine: Lawyer Cantini

References

External links

1995 films
Films directed by Ettore Scola
Italian drama films
Films set in Rome
Films shot in Rome
1995 drama films
Films with screenplays by Ettore Scola
1990s Italian-language films
1990s Italian films